Bujumbura Province is a former province of Burundi. It is now split into the Bujumbura Mairie Province (which contains the country's former capital Bujumbura) and the Bujumbura Rural Province.

 
Provinces of Burundi